Nicholas Damant (c. 1531–1616) was a magistrate and statesman in the Habsburg Netherlands. He was born in Brussels around 1531, the son of Pierre Damant, a councillor and courtier to Charles V. His brother, Pieter Damant, became bishop of Ghent
Nicholas graduated Licentiate of Laws and practised as a lawyer before being appointed to the Council of Brabant by the Duke of Alva on 7 May 1568. In 1578 he was among those who fled Brussels when it fell to the Dutch Revolt, and in 1584 he was among those whose moveable goods were seized and sold at public auction by the new regime. In 1582 he became councillor and master of requests of the Brussels Privy Council, then sitting in Tournai. On 7 April 1585 he was appointed to the Council of Flanders, over protests that as a native of the Duchy of Brabant he was unqualified, and on 13 June 1585 he was appointed Chancellor of Brabant. On 12 December 1587 he was appointed keeper of the seals of Philip II of Spain as ruler of the Low Countries. His wife, Barbara Brant, died in Madrid in 1591. Damant returned to the Low Countries and resumed his functions there in 1596. He died in Brussels on 17 July 1616 and was buried in Brussels minster.

References

Date of birth uncertain
1616 deaths
Jurists from Brussels
Chancellors of Brabant
Politicians of the Habsburg Netherlands